The Gates of Doom is a 1917 American silent drama film directed by Charles Swickard and starring Claire McDowell, Lee Shumway and Mark Fenton.

Cast
 Claire McDowell as Indore / Agatha
 Lee Shumway as Francis Duane 
 Jack Connolly as Terence Unger
 Mark Fenton as Sir Ethelbert Duane
 Tommie Dale as Florence Duane
 Alfred Allen as Grand Duke Alexis
 Francis McDonald as Jang Sattib
 Lina Basquette as Agatha as a child

References

Bibliography
 George A. Katchmer. Eighty Silent Film Stars: Biographies and Filmographies of the Obscure to the Well Known. McFarland, 1991.

External links
 

1917 films
1917 drama films
1910s English-language films
American silent feature films
Silent American drama films
American black-and-white films
Universal Pictures films
Films directed by Charles Swickard
1910s American films